Nottingham University Business School (NUBS) is the business school of the University of Nottingham, United Kingdom situated on the university's Jubilee Campus.

The business school was formed from the university's departments of industrial economics, accounting and insurance and its Institute of Management Studies. The school was originally known as the School of Management and Finance.

Rankings
The 2019 Times Higher Education World University Rankings’ ranked the School 7th among UK business schools and 87th in the World for business and management subjects.
The 2018 Times Higher Education World University Rankings’ ranked the School 11th among UK business schools and 75th in the World for business and management subjects.

NUBS's MBA program continuously gets into top 100 global MBA ranking by The Economist, and in the year 2021 the programme was ranked 55th globally and 3rd in the UK. NUBS also ranks overall 45th in the world and 1st in the UK in the Aspen Institute's 2011–2012. Financial Times consistently ranks its MSc Finance and Investment programme among the top Global Masters in Finance programmes. The Research Excellence Framework 2014 ranks the school 6th in the UK by "research power".

Times Higher Education and the Wall Street Journal business school report put the School`s Master in Finance program at the top 10 program in the World.

The Corporate Knights 2018 Top 40 Better World MBA ranking rated Nottingham University Business School among the global top 20 for sustainability education. In this ranking the school is on a par with business schools like Harvard, LBS, Stanford and MIT Sloan.

Academic departments

Research and teaching in the Business School is organised within the following seven academic departments:

Accounting
Finance, Risk and Banking
Industrial Economics
Marketing
Operations Management and Information Systems
Organisational Behaviour and Human Resource Management
Strategy and International Business

Both within and across academic departments academic staff are also members of the Business School's research centres and institutes, listed below.

Research centres and institutes
The University of Nottingham Business School is home to the following research centres and institutes:
 The Centre for Risk, Banking and Financial Services (CRBFS)
 The Global Centre for Banking and Financial Innovation (GCBFI)
 The Haydn Green Institute for Innovation and Entrepreneurship (HGI) 
 International Centre for Corporate Social Responsibility (ICCSR) 
 The Centre for Research in the Behavioural Sciences (CRIBS)
 Centre for Health Innovation, Leadership and Learning (CHILL)
 China Research Group (CRG)

Degree programmes
The Nottingham University Business School (NUBS) offers a number of undergraduate and postgraduate degrees, including the one-year Master's of Business Administration (MBA), MBA for Executives, and PhD degrees. The programmes are offered not only in the NUBS UK campus, but also in their campuses at Ningbo, China and at Semenyih, Selangor, Malaysia. NUBS Executive MBA is also available in Singapore.

Almost all programs and courses are accredited or supported by business (PwC, NHS, ICAEW Deloitte, Ernst and Young, HSBC,) or by professional institutions like CFA, ACCA, CIM.

Master of Business Administration (MBA)
The full-time MBA is one of the main programmes of the Business School. Each year approximately 50 MBA students attend the programme.
Admissions standards are rigorous, with an average Graduate Management Admission Test score of 690 and IELTS 7.5 (no less than 7.0 in each band).Usually, students come with extensive managerial work experience in distinguished firms. MBA students have plenty of opportunities throughout the year to participate at business conferences.

BSc Hons Accountancy (PwC Flying Start degree program)
The four year program at an undergraduate level is run collaboratively by the Nottingham University Business School, the Institute of Chartered Accountants in England and Wales (ICAEW) and  PricewaterhouseCoopers (PwC). The program covers the modules in financial accounting, assurance, principles of taxation, business law, microeconomics, macroeconomics, quantitative methods, organisation studies and business computing.

MSc Business Analytics
The top-notch specialist course that has been developed by the N-LAB (Neo-demographic Laboratory for Analytics in Business). It is offered purely in collaboration with multinational business (World Bank, Experian, IBM, NHS, Tesco, Boots UK) in order to provide the exact skillset that they are looking for.

MSc Banking and Finance
The program is accredited by the Chartered Banker Institute and has the focus on the modern knowledge about banking, financial markets and risk management in the financial institutes.

MSc Finance and Investment
The program covers the modern topics and approaches in corporate finance including modern financial instruments, financial modelling, capital markets and financial security valuation. The University of Nottingham is participating in the CFA Institute University Affiliation Program. MSc Finance and Investment is recognised by the Chartered Financial Analysts (CFA) Institute as the curriculum covers significant portion of the CFA Program Candidate Body of Knowledge (CBOK)—including the Code of Ethics and Standards of Professional Conduct.

MSc Risk Management
The program is accredited by the Chartered Insurance Institute and covers the areas of risk analysis, risk and society, management of risks in banks and in insurance companies, quantitative risk management, and the strategic use of insurance in risk management.

Business School exchange programme
Exchange programme at Nottingham University Business School is open to all full-time undergraduate students. Successful applicants can study at a partner institution for a semester as part of their degree.

The institutions available through the University-Wide Programme are :
Oregon State University, USA
Ohio State University, USA
University of Illinois, USA  
University of New South Wales, Sydney, Australia
University of Melbourne, Australia
Lund University, Sweden
University of Hong Kong, China

Media
NUBIZ magazine is published by Nottingham University Business School particular for alumni. It contains topical business articles as well as news and interviews with fellow alumni.

Connect Online is the digital magazine for alumni of the University of Nottingham, linking Nottingham graduates around the world.

Faculty
Professor Evangelos Benos
Professor David Kelsey
Professor David Paton
Professor Bart L. MacCarthy
Professor Anna Soulsby 
Professor Bob Berry
Professor Ken Starkey
Dr Alison Sinclair
Professor Jane Frecknall-Hughes
Professor Heidi Winklhofer
Professor Laurie Cohen
Professor Thomas Chesney

Deans
Professor Leigh Drake (2007-2010),
Professor Martin Binks (2010-2015),
Professor Alistair Bruce (2015-2017),
Professor James Devlin (2017-2019),
Professor Duncan Angwin (2019- 2023),

References

External links

Nottingham University Business School Malaysia
Nottingham University Business School China

Business schools in England
University of Nottingham